Elie Mitri (born 26 January 1980) (Arabic; ايلي متري) is a Lebanese actor, writer and stand up comedian.

Film/TV
A graduate of the Lebanese Academy of Fine Arts in 2003, his career was launched in 2006 when he starred in Falafel, directed by Michel Kammoun. The film, which follows an overnight series of mishaps a young man lives through in Beirut, garnered a lot of attention internationally. In 2009 he took on the role of Saint Charbel in the biographical film Charbel: The Movie (2009), bringing insight and realism to the life of one of Lebanon's most beloved saints. A variety of roles followed, such as the romantic Karim in Habbet Loulou and May in the Summer the drug addicted Cherif in "Horoub: Escape (2012)" and as Max in "Max w Antar (2016)", a comedy about a young man and his dog. Mitri took part in many independent and commercial projects covering socio-political issues in Lebanon, such as Chatti Ya Dinni, Void and "Mahroumin: The Deprived (2017)".

TV Show Host - Crazy Science
Although he is primarily known as an actor, Mitri has co-hosted along with Nancy Iskandar, the Crazy Science show, an hour long family show filled with chemical trials and science experiments, usually conducted on Mitri himself. In one interview, he said that the program was one of the achievements he was really proud of, when he saw the positive impact it had on children who watched the show.

Ad Films
Elie Mitri has also starred in an ad for BMW motors. He was spotted by director by Sune Sorensen and was cast in the role of a brother estranged from his sibling.

Theater

Filmography

References

External links
 
 

21st-century Lebanese male actors
Living people
1980 births
University of Balamand alumni
Lebanese male film actors
Place of birth missing (living people)
Lebanese male actors